Sergio Arturo Torres Santos (born 19 April 1963) is a Mexican politician from the National Action Party. From 2009 to 2012 he served as Deputy of the LXI Legislature of the Mexican Congress representing Michoacán.

References

1963 births
Living people
Politicians from Michoacán
National Action Party (Mexico) politicians
People from La Piedad
21st-century Mexican politicians
Deputies of the LXI Legislature of Mexico
Members of the Chamber of Deputies (Mexico) for Michoacán